The North American Boxing Organization (NABO) is one of several regulators of boxing that works in North America.  The NABO is one of the regional bodies that is part of the World Boxing Organization.

Current champions

See also
List of NABO champions

References

External links

Professional boxing organizations
Boxing in North America
World Boxing Organization